Adrian Iordache (born 13 November 1981) is a retired Romanian football striker. He made 89 appearances in Liga I and also played in the top division in Greece and in second division in Germany.

Honours
FC Argeş Piteşti
Romanian Second League: 2007–08

External links
 

1981 births
Living people
Sportspeople from Pitești
Romanian footballers
Romanian expatriate footballers
Liga I players
Super League Greece players
2. Bundesliga players
Association football forwards
FC Argeș Pitești players
Levadiakos F.C. players
FC Energie Cottbus players
CS Pandurii Târgu Jiu players
Association football defenders